Blandford Cemetery is a historic cemetery located in Petersburg, Virginia. The oldest stone, marking the grave of Richard Yarbrough, reads 1702. It is located adjacent to the People's Memorial Cemetery, a historic African-American cemetery.

Although veterans of every American war are buried there, the largest is a mass grave of 30,000 Confederates killed in the Siege of Petersburg (1864–65) during the American Civil War. Only 3,700 names of the interred are known.

Over the entrance road is a stone arch labeled "Our Confederate Heroes" with the dates 1861–1865 and 1866–1913.

In 1866 Blandford Cemetery was the site of one of the earliest Decoration Day ceremonies. While visiting the cemetery, the wife of Union General John A. Logan was present and reportedly witnessed Miss Nora Fontaine Davidson, a schoolteacher, and her pupils putting flowers and tiny Confederate flags on the soldiers' graves. Shortly afterward General Logan issued a proclamation to the Grand Army of the Republic (a very large Union veterans association) calling for the observance of Memorial Day. Locals say that Decoration Day served as the inspiration for the federal Memorial Day.

In 2014 Bellware and Gardiner dismissed this claim in The Genesis of the Memorial Day Holiday in America, pointing out that General Logan was aware of the southern observances of Memorial Day prior to his wife's trip to Virginia in 1868 and had mentioned them in a speech in 1866.

The cemetery grounds cover , making it the second largest cemetery in Virginia (Arlington National Cemetery being the largest). The original burial grounds, referred to as the "old ground," span  and includes the historic Blandford Church.

Colonel Robert Bolling, Confederate Major General William Mahone, his wife Otelia, and many of their kinfolk, Confederate Brigadier General Cullen A. Battle and Confederate Brigadier General David A. Weisiger are interred there.

The cemetery is adjacent to Blandford Church which is a Confederate memorial that features a full set of windows designed by Tiffany studios.

The cemetery was listed on the National Register of Historic Places in 1992.

Notable burials
 John Herbert Claiborne
 Joseph Cotten - American film, stage, radio and television actor.
 Patrick H. Drewry
 James Gholson
 Alva Curtis Hartsfield: one of 10 students from the Virginia Military Institute killed at the Battle of New Market on May 15, 1864.
 Francis R. Lassiter
 Frank Lyon (1867–1955), American lawyer, newspaper publisher and land developer
 Benjamin McCandlish - United States Navy Commodore and former Naval Governor of Guam.
 Margherita Wood McCandlish (1892-1954) - American former First Lady of Guam.
 William Robertson McKenney
 Patricia Medina - British actress.
 Major General William Phillips
 Mary Tannahill
 Edward Carrington Venable

References

Cemeteries on the National Register of Historic Places in Virginia
Cemeteries in Petersburg, Virginia
Confederate States of America monuments and memorials in Virginia
National Register of Historic Places in Petersburg, Virginia
Tourist attractions in Petersburg, Virginia
1702 establishments in Virginia